Alcetas was the brother of Perdiccas II, king of ancient Macedonia. Alcetas was the son of Alexander I and an unknown queen; he was a grandson of Amyntas I. Following the unexpected death of Alexander I in 454 BC, Alcetas obtained his own local realm and power base (arkhai). However, Perdiccas annexed the territory at some unknown point, but ultimately spared Alcetas' life. He evidently retained some responsibility in his brother's government as Alcetas name follows the king's on a list of Macedonian signatories to a peace treaty with Athens. Plato, through his interlocutors in Gorgias, wrote that Perdiccas' successor, Archelaus, murdered both Alcetas and his son Alexander.

References

See also 
List of ancient Macedonians

413 BC deaths
Murdered royalty of Macedonia (ancient kingdom)
Year of birth unknown